Annelies may refer to:

 Annelies (novel), a 2019 alternative history novel by David R. Gillham
 Annelies (Whitbourn), a 2005 choral work based on The Diary of Anne Frank
 Anne Frank (born Annelies; 1929–1945), German-Dutch diarist 
 Annelies Verlinden (born 1978), Belgian politician